The Paraná gubernatorial election was held on 5 October 2014 to elect the next governor of the state of Paraná.  Governor Beto Richa successfully ran for reelection, winning without the need for a runoff.

Candidates
Gleisi Hoffmann 13 (PT)
Haroldo Ferreira 13 (PDT)
Roberto Requião 15 (PMDB)
Rosane Ferreira 15 (PV)
Rodrigo Tomazini 16 (PSTU)
Érika Andreassy 16 (PSTU)
Gionísio Marinho 28 (PRTB)
Rosângela Balduino 28 (PRTB)
Tulio Bandeira 36 (PTC)
Ulisses Sabino 36 (PTC)
Ogier Buchi 44 (PRP)
Elson Robas 44 (PRP)
Beto Richa 45 (PSDB)
Cida Borghetti 45 (PROS)
Bernardo Pilotto 50 (PSOL)
Maicon Palagano 50 (PSOL)

Coalitions

Opinion Polling

Results

References

2014 Brazilian gubernatorial elections
Paraná gubernatorial elections
October 2014 events in South America